The 2015 FC Zhetysu season is the 9th successive season that the club playing in the Kazakhstan Premier League, the highest tier of association football in Kazakhstan, and 19th in total. Zhetysu will also take part in the Kazakhstan Cup.

Askar Kozhabergenov resigned as the club's manager on 20 April 2015, with Ivan Azovskiy taking over in a caretaker capacity. On 28 May, Azovskiy was appointed as the club's permanent manager.

Squad

Transfers

Winter

In:

Out:

Summer

In:

Out:

Competitions

Kazakhstan Premier League

First round

Results summary

Results by round

Results

League table

Relegation round

Results summary

Results by round

Results

League table

Relegation play-off

Kazakhstan Cup

Squad statistics

Appearances and goals

|-
|colspan="14"|Players away from Zhetysu on loan:
|-
|colspan="14"|Players who appeared for Zhetysu that left during the season:

|}

Goal scorers

Disciplinary record

Notes
Atyrau were awarded the victory after Zhetysu fielded to many foreign players.

References

FC Zhetysu seasons
Zhetysu